The spotted lampeye (Lacustricola maculatus) is a species of poeciliid fish. It is native to the drainages of the Ruvu, Rufiji, Mbezi, and Wami Rivers in Kenya and Tanzania. This species grows to a length of  TL. Its natural habitats are small rivers, brooks and swamps. This species is also found in the aquarium trade.

References 

Lacustricola
Freshwater fish of Kenya
Freshwater fish of Tanzania
Fish described in 1957
Taxa named by Wolfgang Klausewitz
Taxonomy articles created by Polbot
Taxobox binomials not recognized by IUCN